Scots College or Scots School may refer to:

Catholic seminaries
 Scots College (Paris), France, (founded 1325)
 Scots College, Douai, France, (founded 1573)
 Scots College (Rome), Italy, (founded 1600), also known as The Pontifical Scots College
 Scots College, Valladolid

Other establishments

Argentina

Australia
 Scots College (Sydney), in Bellevue Hill, Sydney
 Scots PGC College, in Warwick, Queensland, formed by the merger of The Scots College, Warwick and The Presbyterian Girls' College
 Scots School Albury, New South Wales
 Scots School, Bathurst, New South Wales

France
Collège des Écossais, Montpellier ('Scots College')
Scots College (Paris)

New Zealand
 Scots College, Wellington

See also
Bombay Scottish School
Scotch College (disambiguation)
Scots Kirk (disambiguation)